State Route 177 (SR 177) is a  state highway in the southeastern part of the U.S. state of Georgia. It exists in two distinct sections, split by the Okefenokee National Wildlife Refuge, Okefenokee Swamp, and Okefenokee Wilderness, that travels south-to-north through portions of Clinch, Ware, Charlton, and Brantley counties.

Route description

Southern segment
SR 177 begins at an intersection with US 441/SR 89/SR 94 just southeast of Fargo, in Clinch County. It heads northeast, through portions of Ware and Charlton counties. SR 177 enters the Okefenokee Swamp and then the Okefenokee National Wildlife Refuge. Farther to the northeast it enters Stephen C. Foster State Park and ends at a dead end in the northern end of the park.

Northern segment
The route resumes at the northern entrance of Okefenokee Swamp Park. It travels to the north and then to the northeast and has an intersection with US 1/US 23/SR 4 west of Laura S. Walker State Park, which is located southeast of Waycross, in Ware County. It travels along the southern edge of the park, and very briefly enters Brantley County. SR 177 re-enters Ware County, and enters the park. The highway heads to the north-northwest of US 82/SR 520, north of the park.

National Highway System
SR 177 is not part of the National Highway System, a system of roadways important to the nation's economy, defense, and mobility.

Major intersections

See also

References

External links
 

 Georgia Roads (Routes 161 - 180)
 Georgia State Route 177 on State-Ends.com

177
Transportation in Clinch County, Georgia
Transportation in Ware County, Georgia
Transportation in Charlton County, Georgia
Transportation in Brantley County, Georgia